Bust commonly refers to:

 A woman's breasts
 Bust (sculpture), of head and shoulders
 An arrest

Bust may also refer to:

Places
Bust, Bas-Rhin, a city in  France
Lashkargah, Afghanistan, known as Bust historically

Media
Bust (magazine) of feminist pop culture
Bust, a British television series (1987–1988)
"Bust", a 2015 song by rapper Waka Flocka Flame

Other uses
Bust, in blackjack
Boom and bust economic cycle
Draft bust in sports, referring to an highly touted athlete that does not meet expectations

See also
Busted (disambiguation)
Crimebuster (disambiguation)
Gangbuster (disambiguation)